XHSCAM-FM is a community radio station on 105.9 FM in Ziracuaretiro, Michoacán. The station is owned by the civil association Radio Juchari Iretarhu Anapu, A.C.

History
Radio Juchari Iretarhu Anapu filed for a community station on October 10, 2016. The station's award was approved on May 23, 2018.

References

Radio stations in Michoacán
Community radio stations in Mexico